Wulfhild of Norway (1020 – 24 May 1071), Old West Norse: Úlfhildr Ólafsdóttir, Swedish: Ulfhild Olofsdotter, was a Norwegian princess, and a duchess of Saxony by marriage to Ordulf, Duke of Saxony.

Life

Wulfhild was born in 1020 as the only legitimate child of King Olaf II of Norway and his wife Astrid Olofsdotter of Sweden. Her illegitimate half-brother was Magnus the Good. She was likely born and raised in Sarpsborg.

In 1028, she accompanied her parents to Vestlandet, and in 1029, she left Norway for Sweden with them. It is not determined whether she followed her father and half-brother on their trip to Russia or remained in Sweden with her mother, but she did live in Sweden between the death of her father in 1030 until she returned with her half-brother Magnus to Norway in 1035, when he became king. Wulfhild is described as a beauty, and is thought to have been greatly respected as the only legitimate child of her father and daughter of a saint.

On 10 November 1042, she was married to Ordulf, son of Bernard II, Duke of Saxony. This marriage was supposed to strengthen the alliance between Saxony and Denmark; her half-brother expected the support of her consort to strengthen his position in Denmark by fighting the Wends. The marriage ceremony was celebrated in Schleswig during these political negotiations, officiated by the archbishops of Schleswig and Bremen. Her husband did remain loyal to the alliance, but the information about Wulfhild is limited and nothing is known about any of her opinions.

Wulfhild and Ordulf had a son, Magnus, Duke of Saxony.

References

Sources

References
 Norsk biografisk leksikon. Den store norske
 Bratberg, Terje. (2009, 13. februar). Ulvhild Olavsdatter. I Norsk biografisk leksikon. Hentet 24. februar 2018 fra https://nbl.snl.no/Ulvhild_Olavsdatter.

1020 births
Fairhair dynasty
1071 deaths
Norwegian princesses
11th-century Norwegian nobility
11th-century German nobility
11th-century German women
11th-century Norwegian women
Daughters of kings